The Bemarivo river in Sofia Region, is located in northern Madagascar. It drains to the northern coast, into the Anjobony shortly before the Sofia River, near Boriziny (Port Bergé).

It is flows along the RN 6  and RN 4.

References 

Rivers of Madagascar
Rivers of Sofia Region